Seattle is the largest city in the U.S. state of Washington and has long played a major role in the state's musical culture, popularizing genres of alternative rock such as grunge and being the origin of major bands like Alice in Chains, Soundgarden, Pearl Jam, and Foo Fighters. The city remains home to several influential bands, labels, and venues.

History

Founding: 1800s–1945 
Seattle's music history begins in the mid-19th century, when the first European settlers arrived. In 1909, amidst the boosterism engendered by the city's first world's fair, the Alaska-Yukon-Pacific Exposition, the Seattle City Council adopted "Seattle, the Peerless City" (words by Arthur O. Dillon; music by Glenn W. Ashley) as Seattle's official song.

By the early 20th century, Seattle had an upper-class society that established an urban culture, which included music; the city's high culture was, however, shadowed by that of San Francisco, which was then the major cultural center of the West Coast. Seattle also became an important stop for vaudeville tours, put on by large chains like Pantages and Considine; the city also produced a major attraction in the exotic dancer Gypsy Rose Lee. The Whangdoodle Entertainers was one of Seattle's first jazz bands. By the 1920s, Seattle had also come to support a politically radical American folk scene, inspired in part by several lengthy stays in the region by folk singer Woody Guthrie; Seattle's folk performers included Ivar Haglund, who later founded a chain of successful seafood restaurants. The Seattle jazz scene included Jelly Roll Morton for several years in the early part of the century, as well as Vic Meyers, a local performer and nightclub owner who became Lieutenant Governor in 1932. E. Russell "Noodles" Smith, founder of the Dumas Club and the Entertainers Club, was another important name in the Seattle Jazz scene of the day.

Early musical establishments included the art school founded by Nellie Cornish, which saw residencies from both John Cage and Martha Graham, and the Seattle Symphony, which became embroiled in a controversy in the early 1940s when British conductor Thomas Beecham either described Seattle as a "cultural dustbin" or warned that it could become one.

Postwar era: 1945–1975 

World War II brought a "flourishing" vice scene, where "booze, gambling and prostitution" were unchecked by "paid-off cops". The Showbox Ballroom was a center for these activities; it was open twenty-four hours a day, geared towards active members of the military, featuring popular performers like the racy Gypsy Rose Lee.  In addition to the Showbox, Washington Hall, Parker's, Odd Fellows Temple and Trianon were also major big band ballrooms, all of which eventually became major rock music venues. 

Police officers also tolerated an after-hours jazz scene, based in Chinatown, Seattle and including most famously the Black and Tan Club. This period produced a few local performers of note, including Ray Charles, who recorded his first single and made his debut tv appearances and radio broadcasts in Seattle, and Bumps Blackwell. Blackwell was a bandleader whose band included the instrumentalist Quincy Jones. Harry Everett Smith was a college student in the 1940s when he found a number of recordings of folk music about to be recycled at a Salvation Army depot. He rescued the recordings, which became hot commodities when released by Folkways on the landmark Anthology of American Folk Music. 

Music patriarch Frank D. Waldron was an early member of the just formed black musicians' union, AFM Local 458. African Americans challenged and changed the Jazz culture within Seattle with great force.

Changes to local regulations in 1949 prompted a shift from "private clubs" to "restaurant-lounge combinations" which "didn't support much in the line of creative nightlife" and even helped to drive out the city's jazz nightclub scene. Boeing emerged in the 1940s and 1950s as one of the city's largest employers, and, according to local music historian Clark Humphrey, helped give the city a reputation as "quiet, orderly (and) dull"; in the mid-1950s, Seattle Post-Intelligencer reporter Emmett Watson was asked to begin a column on Seattle's happenings, but he responded that there was nothing worth writing about.

The early 1960s saw Seattle become home to a local dance scene built around venues like the Trianon and Parker's. The city also became the major center for recorded popular music in the Pacific Northwest, and had the first American pop hit from the region with the Fleetwoods "Come Softly to Me" in 1959.

That same year, the DJ Pat O'Day began working for KJR, and then mounted a series of teen dances featuring bands like the Fabulous Wailers, later to become famous as the Wailers with hits like "Tall Cool One."  The Wailers first album came out on Golden Crest Records; subsequent releases came out on Etiquette, the first record label owned by the band that recorded for it.  The Wailers only had one more national hit, "Mau Mau", but released a long series of regionally popular recordings. Though the Wailers were very popular in the Seattle area, they were actually from Tacoma, as were several other regional bands including the Swaggerz.

O'Day worked with a number of local bands, several of whom had regional hits like the Frantics' "Werewolf" and "Straight Flush".  The Frantics, the Wailers, and most other local rock bands in the Pacific Northwest were basically instrumental combos, with very limited vocals or none at all. the Ventures and the Viceroys were both largely instrumental, with the former gaining national acclaim as a surf band.

Though most of the regionally important bands in the 1960s were dominated by white men, Seattle also produced a few female country rock performers, most notably Merrilee Rush and Bonnie Guitar.  The city's black music scene include Ron Holden, a soul singer whose "Love You So" was a Top Ten hit, vocal group the Gallahads and R&B instrumentalist Dave Lewis, who had several hits like "David's Mood" and "Little Green Thing".

Seattle's most famous black musical export is Jimi Hendrix, who began performing in the city but did not gain a national reputation until moving to England.  Though Hendrix had to move to England to start his recording career, the reverse also became true for the musicologist Ian Whitcomb, who performed in the city in the 1960s.  He recorded "This Sporting Life" with Gerry Rosalie of the Sonics, and the song became a major hit, and an early anthem for the gay community.

Sax/conga drum vocalist Gerald Brashear and Wanda Brown were fixtures in the Seattle jazz scene from the 1930s to the 80s.

Counterculture: 1975–1985 
Music author Steven Blush described the Seattle music scene of the late 1970s and early 1980s as crucial in its "vibe and ethic" which inspired grunge music. The earliest local alternative music scene was based around a gay glam theater group called Ze Whiz Kids, one of whose members, Tomata du Plenty, became a fixture in New York before returning in 1976 as part of the Tupperwares with long-time boyfriend Gorilla Rose; Blush described this as the first punk rock in the area.  The first punk concert in Seattle was the Tupperwares backed by the Telepaths at the grand premiere of Pink Flamingos at the Moore Theater on New Years night, 1976. Tomata and Gorilla left for Los Angeles in 1977, but a new wave of local bands emerged in their wake, congregating at a local venue called The Bird. These bands included the Enemy, the Lewd, the Mentors, Chinas Comidas, the Telepaths, the Beakers, Red Dress, X-15 and the Meyce. 

Following The Bird, local punk centered around an old theatre called The Showbox, where touring bands from Los Angeles, New York, London and elsewhere played. Other, smaller venues included The Gorilla Room and Wrex, which later became Vogue. Hardcore punk, a loud, intense and angry form of punk, first came to Seattle in the band Solger, which formed in 1980.  They were followed by the Fartz, who included Paul Solger of Solger, and became well known in hardcore scenes across the West Coast, and touring with Black Flag and the Dead Kennedys.  The Fartz dissolved in 1982, just as their EP World Full of Hate was released by Alternative Tentacles.  Other local bands included the Fags, the Refuzors, the Rejectors, and the DT's; both the Refuzors and the DT's were led by Mike Refuzor née Michael Lambert. The Fastbacks were affiliated with the scene, but were not considered either hardcore or punk. Also of note from this time frame is the national emergence of progressive heavy metal artists Queensrÿche (from Bellevue, a suburb of Seattle). 

Fifteen bands of that era, including the Blackouts, the Pudz, the Fastbacks and the Fartz contributed songs to the first edition of the "Seattle Syndrome" compilation, released in late 1981 on Engram Records and regarded by music historian Stephen Tow as "a critical yardstick in the history of underground Seattle music". 

Heart, fronted by sisters Ann and Nancy Wilson of Bellevue, got their start in the Seattle area in local bands while still in their teens. Their fame was achieved while residing in Vancouver B.C. Canada, with their 1975 debut album Dreamboat Annie. Ann's boyfriend Mike Fisher, brother of original Heart guitarist Roger Fisher, was evading the Vietnam draft in Canada. Ann met and followed him to Vancouver. Mike was the band's original manager. Upon amnesty granted by President Carter, on January 21, 1977, Heart returned to the United States and signed with Capitol Records. Heart was inducted into the Rock and Rock Hall of Fame in April 2013.

Grunge music: 1985–1995 

Prior to the mid-1980s, the local hardcore and metal scenes were often violently confrontational with each other. The opening of the Gorilla Gardens venue changed that by offering two separate shows at the same time; as a result, both hardcore and metal were frequently played on the same nights. The softening of relations between the two groups helped inspire the look and sound of grunge, a term allegedly coined by Mark Arm of the brief joke band Mr. Epp and the Calculations who gained some local notoriety.  

Two local bands later become well-known icons of the era: The U-Men and Green River, the latter of which has been cited as the true beginning of grunge.  Local music author Clark Humphrey has attributed the rise of grunge, in large part, to the scene's "supposed authenticity", to its status as a "folk phenomenon, a community of ideas and styles that came up from the street" rather than "something a couple of packagers in a penthouse office" dreamed of, as well as Seattle's isolation from the mainstream record industry.  Rebee Garofalo attributes to the unlikely rise of Seattle's alternative rock to the legacy of local rock left behind by the Ventures and Jimi Hendrix. 

The grunge scene revolved around Sub Pop, a record label founded by Bruce Pavitt and Jonathan Poneman. Sub Pop was founded by Bruce Pavitt, who began with a local radio show and began releasing tapes of local bands. Radio stations like KJET, KGRG and KCMU and local music press like Backlash and Seattle Rocket and City Heat Magazine also played a vital role.  Grunge's entrance into the mainstream is usually traced to the release of Nirvana's Nevermind in 1991, though others point to the signing of Soundgarden to A&M Records in 1988 and their Grammy-nominated Ultramega OK, and the release of a compilation album called Deep Six on C/Z Records in 1986.  Though Soundgarden failed to bring in large national audiences at the time, record executives saw enough promise to send scouts out to the major bands, many of whom signed to large labels.  

The 1991 release of Nevermind catapulted the local scene into national fame. Nirvana, Pearl Jam, Alice In Chains and other grunge bands became bestselling groups; many of their earlier fans greeted this development with cries of selling out, and the bands themselves struggled with the irony of alternative rock bands entering mainstream pop culture.  Seattle grunge as national fare ended abruptly in a few years, however, beginning with the suicide of Nirvana frontman Kurt Cobain in 1994. 

During the 1990s other forms of music also existed, including bands such as the Posies, Kill Switch...Klick, Faith & Disease and Sky Cries Mary.

Expansion: 1995–present 
Even though the grunge era faded in the mid-90s, Sub Pop records maintained a strong presence in the indie music scene, signing and promoting Seattle and Northwest-regional bands such as Sunny Day Real Estate, Modest Mouse, The Postal Service, Death Cab for Cutie, Band of Horses, The Head and the Heart, Shabazz Palaces, Fleet Foxes, and SixTwoSeven.  In 2001, KCMU changed their call sign to KEXP-FM, and continues to be active in promoting independent and alternative Seattle music. Grunge-era venue The Crocodile Cafe, where Nirvana played some of their earliest live shows, closed in 2007, but reopened March 2009. Numerous local venues such as Neumos, the Showbox Theatre, the Vera Project, Chop Suey, the Comet Tavern and the Sunset Tavern also continue to showcase live performances of local bands.

In 1993, underground cult band Sun City Girls relocated to Seattle from Arizona, bringing with them influences of world music and psychedelic and experimental rock. Sun City Girls member Alan Bishop co-founded the record label Sublime Frequencies, which focuses exclusively on "acquiring and exposing obscure sights and sounds from modern and traditional urban and rural frontiers", especially from the Middle East, North Africa, and Southeast Asia; this brought a new awareness of world music traditions to the Seattle music scene.  More local experimental groups formed, such as Climax Golden Twins and Kinski, and the scene attracted established groups such as Estradasphere.

Seattle is also home to hip hop music, with Sir Mix-a-Lot followed by artists such as the Blue Scholars, Common Market, Oldominion, Jake One, and Macklemore. Experimental music has flourished with the improvisational groups We Paint With Sound, The Avant Garde Dogs, and the St. Bees Group, and the Mike N Dave Channel; their "co-comprovisations" feature spontaneous co-composition, performance, and recording of a completed work on the first take.

There is also a significant feminist punk scene in Seattle, led by bands such as TacoCat and Childbirth.

Venues 
Below is a partial list of notable venues:

 Crocodile Cafe
 Moore Theatre
 Paramount Theatre
 The Triple Door
 The Vera Project

See also
 List of musicians from Seattle
 List of songs about Seattle
 Music of Washington (state)

References

Notes

External links 
 Seattle Music at Seattle Weekly
 Seattle's Music & Arts Festival Bumbershoot
 Seattle Music Shows
 Local Music and Events
 March 4, 1978: The Bird Was the Word Seattle Star (2002–2005)

 
Music scenes
Seattle